Sir Henry Lippincott, 1st Baronet (1737–1780), of Littleton-upon-Severn, Gloucestershire, was an English politician.

He was a Member (MP) of the Parliament of Great Britain for Bristol in 1780.

References

1737 births
1780 deaths
Baronets in the Baronetage of Great Britain
People from South Gloucestershire District
Members of the Parliament of Great Britain for Bristol
British MPs 1780–1784